Phrynos was a Greek potter, active in Athens, circa 560–545 BC. He is one of the Little masters. Three signed lip cups by him are known:
Boston, Museum of Fine Arts Inv. 03.855
London, British Museum Inv. 1867.5-8.962 (B 424)
Torgiano,  Wine Museum Inv. A 15
The three cups appear to have been painted by the same painter, the Phrynos Painter, to whom some further pieces can be ascribed. The potter Phrynos probably worked together with the potters  Archikles and Glaukytes, as some of their vases bear close similarities.

See also 
 Little-Master cup

Bibliography 
Oliver S. Tonks: A New Kalos-Artist: Phrynos , in: American Journal of Archaeology 9, 1905, p. 288-293.
John Beazley: Attic Black-figure Vase-painters, Oxford 1956, p. 168.
John Beazley: Paralipomena. Additions to Attic black-figure vase-painters and to Attic red-figure vase-painters, Oxford 1971, p. 70-71.
Joan Tarlow Haldenstein: Little master cups. Studies in 6th century Attic black-figure vase painting, Dissertation University of Cincinnati, 1975, p. 20-32.
 Hermann A. G. Brijder: A band-cup by the Phrynos Painter in Amsterdam, in: M. Gnade (Hrsg.): Stips votiva. Papers presented to Conrad Michael Stibbe, Amsterdam 1991, p. 21-30.
Peter Heesen: Phrynos (I), in: Künstlerlexikon der Antike Bd. 2, 2004, p. 256.

Ancient Greek potters